The 1980 Villanova Wildcats football team represented the Villanova University during the 1980 NCAA Division I-A football season. The head coach was Dick Bedesem, coaching his sixth season with the Wildcats. The team played their home games at Villanova Stadium in Villanova, Pennsylvania. Future NFL Hall of Famer Howie Long was a senior nose guard on the team. In April 1981 the Villanova University Board of Trustees announced the discontinuation of football effective immediately. The decision was highly controversial and triggered efforts resulting in the restoration of football at the Division I-AA level in 1985.

Schedule

Roster

References

Villanova
Villanova Wildcats football seasons
Villanova Wildcats football